Charlie Lytwyn (born 1 October 1964) is a Scottish former professional footballer who played as a forward.

Career
Born in Edinburgh, Lytwyn played for Hibernian, Falkirk, Brechin City, Berwick Rangers, Alloa Athletic, East Stirlingshire, Stenhousemuir and Bonnyrigg Rose Athletic.

References

1964 births
Living people
Scottish footballers
Hibernian F.C. players
Falkirk F.C. players
Brechin City F.C. players
Berwick Rangers F.C. players
Alloa Athletic F.C. players
East Stirlingshire F.C. players
Stenhousemuir F.C. players
Bonnyrigg Rose Athletic F.C. players
Scottish Football League players
Association football forwards